Thomas Missing (1710 – 25 September 1788) was an English politician who served as Member of Parliament for Poole from 1741 to 1747.

Life 
Missing was born in Stubbington, near Titchfield in Hampshire.

Missing built a workhouse in Poole in 1739 at a cost of £500.

He was High Sheriff of Hampshire from 1739 to 1740.

He was first elected to Parliament at the 1741 British general election.

He served two terms as Mayor of Portsmouth in the 1750s.

He died in 1788.

References 

1710 births
1788 deaths
High Sheriffs of Hampshire
Mayors of Portsmouth
People from Titchfield
People from Poole
British MPs 1741–1747
18th-century English businesspeople